Ab Difeh may refer to:
 Ab Difeh, Khuzestan
 Ab Difeh, Lorestan